Jean Marsaudon (3 March 1946, Paris – 18 September 2008) was a member of the National Assembly of France.  He represented the Essonne department,  and was a member of the Union for a Popular Movement.

References

1946 births
2008 deaths
Politicians from Paris
Rally for the Republic politicians
Union for a Popular Movement politicians
Debout la France politicians
Deputies of the 10th National Assembly of the French Fifth Republic
Deputies of the 11th National Assembly of the French Fifth Republic
Deputies of the 12th National Assembly of the French Fifth Republic
Deputies of the 13th National Assembly of the French Fifth Republic
Deaths from cancer in France
Deaths from leukemia